The Association to Advance Collegiate Schools of Business, also known as AACSB International, is an American professional organization. It was founded as the American Assembly of Collegiate Schools of Business in 1916 to provide accreditation to schools of business, and was later known as the American Association of Collegiate Schools of Business and as the International Association for Management Education.

Not all members of the association are accredited; it does not accredit for-profit schools. In 2016 it was denied recognition by the Council for Higher Education Accreditation, and later withdrew from membership; in 2019 it obtained ISO 9001 certification.

It is one of the three component organizations of triple accreditation of business schools.

History 

The American Assembly of Collegiate Schools of Business was founded as an accrediting body in 1916 by a group of seventeen American universities and colleges. The first accreditations took place in 1919. For many years, the association accredited only American business schools, but in the latter part of the twentieth century adopted a more international approach to business education. The first school it accredited outside the United States was the University of Alberta in 1968, and the first outside North America was the French business school ESSEC, in 1997. The present name of the association was adopted in 2001.

In January 2015 the Council for Higher Education Accreditation deferred recognition of the association pending satisfaction of its policy requirements, and in July its Committee on Recognition recommended that recognition be denied. The association withdrew from the council in September 2016. In 2019 it received ISO 9001 certification.

Since June 2020, the organization’s chief executive officer is Caryn Beck-Dudley, who had previously been dean of the Leavey School of Business at Santa Clara University.

See also 
 List of AACSB-accredited schools (accounting)

Notes

References

Further reading 

 Andrea Everard, Jennifer Edmonds, Kent Pierre (2013). The Longitudinal Effects of the Mission – Driven Focus on the Credibility of the AACSB. Journal of Management Development 32 (9):995–1003
 W. Francisco, T.G. Noland, D.Sinclari (2008). AACSB Accreditation: Symbol of Excellence or march toward Mediocrity. Journal of College Teaching & Learning 5 (5):25–30
 Harold Hamilton (2000). AACSB Accreditation: Are the Benefits worth the Cost for a Small School? A Case Study. Proceedings of the American Society of Business and Behavioral Sciences Track Section of Management February 17–21, 2000, Las Vegas, Nevada: 205–206
 Anthony Lowrie, Hugh Willmott (2009). Accreditation Sickness in the Consumption of Business Education: The Vacuum in AACSB Standard Setting. Management Learning 40 (4):411–420
 N. Orwig, R.Z. Finney (2007). Analysis of the Mission Statements of AACSB – Accredited Schools. Competitiveness Review 17 (4):261–273
 E.J Romero (2008). AACSB Accreditation: Addressing Faculty Concerns. Academy of Management Learning and Education 7 (2):245~255
 J.A. Yunker (2000). Doing Things the Hard Way – Problems with Mission-Linked AACSB Accreditation Standards and Suggestions for Improvement. Journal of Education for Business'' 75 (6):348–353

Business education
International college and university associations and consortia
School accreditors
1916 establishments in the United States 
Higher education accreditation 
Accounting education